Kahara is a settlement in Nyeri County, Kenya.

It is part of Mukurweini Constituency. It is connected to Karaba by the 7 kilometres long E555 road 

There is a Kahara Medical Clinic

References 

Populated places in Central Province (Kenya)
Nyeri County